This list of shipwrecks in 1911 includes ships sunk, foundered, grounded, or otherwise lost during 1911.

January

1 January

7 January

10 January

11 January

25 January

28 January

29 January

Unknown date

February

2 February

15 February

18 February

Unknown date

March

2 March

3 March

14 March

15 March

20 March

22 March

23 March

24 March

29 March

April

4 April

7 April

8 April

10 April

21 April

23 April

27 April

29 April

30 April

Unknown date

May

3 May

5 May

12 May

16 May

18 May

20 May

26 May

Unknown date

June

1 June

3 June

6 June

7 June

9 June

10 June

18 June

28 June

29 June

Unknown date

July

1 July

3 July

4 July

5 July

7 July

8 July

9 July

14 July

16 July

18 July

19 July

20 July

22 July

23 July

24 July

25 July

28 July

29 July

31 July

Unknown date

August

1 August

2 August

3 August

5 August

8 August

9 August

10 August

11 August

12 August

15 August

16 August

17 August

18 August

19 August

20 August

21 August

24 August

25 August

26 August

27 August

28 August

29 August

30 August

31 August

September

3 September

4 September

5 September

6 September

8 September

9 September

10 September

14 September

15 September

16 September

18 September

19 September

22 September

23 September

24 September

25 September

26 September

27 September

29 September

30 September

October

1 October

2 October

3 October

4 October

6 October

7 October

9 October

10 October

12 October

13 October

17 October

18 October

19 October

20 October

23 October

24 October

25 October

26 October

27 October

28 October

30 October

31 October

November

1 November

2 November

3 November

5 November

6 November

7 November

9 November

10 November

11 November

12 November

13 November

14 November

16 November

17 November

18 November

19 November

20 November

21 November

23 November

24 November

25 November

27 November

28 November

30 November

Unknown date

December

1 December

3 December

4 December

5 December

6 December

9 December

11 December

12 December

13 December

15 December

17 December

19 December

20 December

22 December

23 December

26 December

27 December

28 December

29 December

31 December

Unknown date

Unknown date

References

1911
Shipwrecks
Ships